Behring may refer to:

People
Alex Behring, a Brazilian businessman.
Emil Adolf von Behring, a German physiologist who received the 1901 Nobel Prize in Physiology or Medicine.
John Behring,  an American cinematographer, television director and producer.
Ken Behring, an American real-estate developer, former owner of the Seattle Seahawks football team, and philanthropist.
Vitus Bering, a Danish explorer for the Russian Empire.

Locations
Bering Strait, sometimes spelled "Behring".
 Behring Sea, archaic spelling of Bering Sea.

Other
65685 Behring, a main-belt asteroid.
CSL Behring, one of the world's leading plasma protein biotherapeutics companies, based in Pennsylvania.
Dade Behring, a company which manufactured testing machinery and supplies for the medical diagnostics industry, based in Deerfield, Illinois and Glasgow, Delaware.